Marcos Aurélio is an Iberian given name.  People with the name include:

 Marcos Aurélio (footballer, born 1984) (Marcos Aurélio de Oliveira Lima)
 Marcos Aurélio (footballer, born 1977) (Marcos Aurélio Fernandes da Silva)
 Marcos Aurelio Di Paulo (1920–1996), Argentine footballer
 Marcos Górriz (Marcos Aurelio Górriz Bonhora, born 1964), Spanish tennis player
 Marcos Aurélio Galeano (born 1972), Brazilian footballer
 Marcos Aurélio Titon (born 1976), known as Marcão, Brazilian–Portuguese footballer 
 Macula (footballer) (Marcos Aurélio dos Santos, born 1968), Brazilian footballer
 Marcos Denner (Marco Aurélio Martins Ivo, born 1976), Brazilian footballer 
 Marquinhos (footballer, born August 1982) (Marcos Aurélio Lima Barros)

See also

Marco Aurélio
Marcus Aurélio

Given names